Richard Berg could refer to: 

Richard Berg (1943–2019), American game designer
Dick Berg (1922–2009), American screenwriter
Dick Berg (1944–2018), American sports promoter and athlete
Rick Berg (born 1959), American politician

See also
Richard Bergh (1858–1919), Swedish artist and critic
Dick Burg (born 1936), American hockey player